William Angerstein (1811 – 31 May 1897) was a British Liberal Party politician.

At the 1859 general election, he was elected as Member of Parliament for Greenwich, and held his seat in the House of Commons until 1865.  He was chosen High Sheriff of Norfolk in 1872.

He was the son of John Angerstein (c. 1774 – 1858), MP for Camelford, 1796, and Greenwich, 1835, and grandson of John Julius Angerstein.

References

External links 
 

1811 births
1897 deaths
Liberal Party (UK) MPs for English constituencies
UK MPs 1859–1865